Highway to Hanno's is the fifth album by Slovenly, released in 1992 through SST Records. It was the band's final album.

Critical reception
Perfect Sound Forever called Highway to Hano's "one of the last truly great albums released on the SST label."

Track listing

Personnel 
Slovenly
Steve Anderson – vocals
Rob Holtzman – drums
Lynn Johnston – saxophone
Tim Plowman – guitar
Tom Watson – guitar
Scott Ziegler – guitar, bass guitar, illustrations
Production and additional personnel
Sam Goldman – violin
Paul Gubser – photography
Norman Kerner – production, engineering, mixing
Heidi Peterson – vocals on "Muddy Puddle"
Christopher Simmersbach – percussion
Slovenly – production
Phil Smoot – trumpet on "Thank You Purple Jesus"

References

External links 
 

1992 albums
Slovenly (band) albums
SST Records albums